Michael Rothwell (13 March 1936 – 24 January 2009) was an actor. Amongst his theatre work, he was part of the National Theatre's 1963/64 company, playing Roderigo in Olivier's Othello in 1964.

Films
 Rentadick (1972 )
 Fragment of Fear (1970)
 Start the Revolution Without Me (1970)
 The Mummy's Shroud (1967)

TV
 The Innes Book of Records (1979)
 Jude the Obscure (1971) as Dawlish
 The First Churchills (1969)
 Strange Report (1969)
 Mystery and Imagination - Casting the Runes (1968)
 Sexton Blake (1968)
 Vanity Fair (1967)
 The Pilgrim's Progress (1967)
 The Avengers (1967) (episode: The £50,000 Breakfast)
 The Plane Makers (1967)
 Write a Play (1967)
 Softly, Softly (1966)
 Thirty-Minute Theatre (1966)
 The Sandwich Man (1966)

References

External links
 

2009 deaths
British male stage actors
British male film actors
British male television actors
1936 births